Prostanthera leichhardtii is a species of flowering plant in the family Lamiaceae and is endemic to  Queensland.  It is a shrub with blue, greyish blue, occasionally yellow or cream flowers.

References

leichhardtii
Flora of Queensland
Lamiales of Australia
Taxa named by George Bentham
Plants described in 1870